Kasimbu is an administrative ward in Kigoma-Ujiji District of Kigoma Region in Tanzania. 
In 2016 the Tanzania National Bureau of Statistics report there were 5,405 people in the ward, from 4,910 in 2012.

Villages / neighborhoods 
The ward has 4 neighborhoods.
 Busomero
 Lumumba
 Mashine
 Ndahiriyo

References

Wards of Kigoma Region